The 37th Infantry Regiment is an inactive infantry regiment in the United States Army.

Other units called "37th Infantry Regiment"
Constituted July 28, 1866, in the Regular Army by act of the United States Congress falling under the command of the Department of the Missouri.  The unit began as the 3rd Battalion of the 19th Infantry Regiment when it was re-designated as the 37th Infantry Regiment, at Little Rock Arsenal, Arkansas.  Consolidated 17 April 1869 by order of the Secretary of War, when the total number of Infantry Regiments were to be reduced to 25.  One-half of the 37th Infantry Regiment consolidated August–December 1869 with the 3rd Infantry Regiment and the consolidated unit was designated as the 3d Infantry Regiment.  While the remaining half of the 37th Infantry consolidated in June 1869 with the 5th Infantry Regiment and redesignated as the 5th Infantry Regiment.

Lineage
Constituted 1 July 1916 in the Regular Army as the 37th Infantry. Organized 12 July 1916 at Fort Sam Houston, Texas from personnel of the 3rd, 9th, and 30th Infantry Regiments, including Colonel Julius Penn, who left command of the 3rd Infantry to organize and train the 37th.

Inactivated 20 October 1921 at Fort Wayne, Michigan. Assigned to the 9th Infantry Division 24 March 1923; Relieved from the 9th Division 1 August 1940.

Activated, less Headquarters and Headquarters Company, at Fort Francis E. Warren, Wyoming. Moved to Fort Greely, Alaska on 13 July 1941 and Headquarters and Headquarters Company activated 1 August 1941 at Unalaska, Alaska. Moved to Adak Island 26 November 1942 and to Atka 24 August 1943. Arrived at Prince Rupert Port of Embarkation, Canada, on 28 January 1944 and departed 5 February 1944. Arrived Camp White, Oregon, 8 February 1944 under Fourth Army] and attached to III Corps 15 February 1944. Transferred to Camp Phillips, Kansas 26 April 1944 under XVI Corps and assigned to XXXVI Corps on 17 July 1944. Arrived Fort Benning, Georgia 14 August 1944 under Replacement and School Command where regiment conducted training for paratrooper volunteers from other branches of the Army. Inactivated 5 February 1945 at Fort Benning, Georgia. Activated 1 August 1946 at Fort Benning, Inactivated 25 January 1949 at Fort Sill, Oklahoma.

Campaign streamers
World War II
 Aleutian Islands

Distinctive unit insignia
 Description
A Silver color metal and enamel device  in height consisting of a shield blazoned: Azure a fess wavy, in chief a mullet both Argent. Attached below the shield a Silver scroll inscribed "FOR FREEDOM" in Blue letters.
 Symbolism
This Regiment was organized at Fort Sam Houston in 1916 and served along the Rio Grande during its first years. The shield is blue for Infantry, with a wavy fess to denote the Rio Grande and the lone star of Texas.
 Background
The distinctive unit insignia was approved on 8 January 1941.

Coat of arms
Blazon
 Shield: Azure a fess wavy, in chief a mullet both Argent.
 Crest: None
Motto FOR FREEDOM.
Symbolism
 Shield: This Regiment was organized at Fort Sam Houston in 1916 and served along the Rio Grande during its first years. The shield is blue for Infantry, with a wavy fess to denote the Rio Grande and the lone star of Texas.
 Crest: None.
Background: The coat of arms was approved on 19 January 1921. It was amended to add the motto on 8 January 1941.

See also
 Distinctive unit insignia

References

Sources

0037